The Making of Malaysia: Britain, the 'Grand Design', Decolonisation and Malaysia is a 2005 book by Professor Anthony John Stockwell which examines the British end of empire policy relating to the decolonisation of North Borneo, Sarawak, Brunei and Singapore on the way to the formation of the new federation of Malaysia during the 1960s. Stockwell draws on an analysis of government and personal documents from the period in order to reveal the complex negotiations and rivalries involved in the transition.

External links 
 The Making of Malaysia: Britain, the 'Grand Design', Decolonisation and Malaysia at Amazon.com

Works by Anthony Stockwell
Formation of Malaysia
I.B. Tauris books
2005 non-fiction books